The Germansen Range is a small subrange of the Swannell Ranges of the Omineca Mountains, bounded by Germansen Lake and South Germansen River northern British Columbia, Canada.

See also
Germansen River
Germansen Landing

References

Germansen Range in the Canadian Mountain Encyclopedia

Swannell Ranges